52nd Armoured Regiment is an armoured regiment of the Indian Army Armoured Corps.

Formation
The regiment was raised on 1 February 1994 at Roorkee with T-72 tanks. The first commandant was Col Jugvir Singh. The first Colonel of the regiment was Brigadier A.S. Sinha. The regiment has an all India, all class composition.

History
Capt Upmanyu Singh of the regiment was posthumously awarded the Sena Medal in 2011 for gallantry during counter insurgency operations at Sopore in north Kashmir's Baramulla district.

The present Colonel of the regiment is Brig Samarth Nagar.

Regimental Insignia
The cap badge of the regiment is unique in the Indian Army, as it consists of a Welsh dragon motif against a background of two vertically parallel lances with a scroll below bearing the words "52 Armoured Regiment".

The motto of the regiment is "We lead through danger".

The unit flag contains four colours - French Grey, Buff, Red and Green which signify the phrase "In misty dawn, through sand and blood to green fields beyond."

References

Armoured and cavalry regiments of the Indian Army from 1947
Military units and formations established in 1994